Searcy High School (SHS) is a comprehensive public high school  serving the community of Searcy, Arkansas, United States. Located in White County, Searcy High School is the sole high school managed by the Searcy School District and serves students in grades nine through twelve.

History 
The Searcy public school system was established in 1870. Searcy High School is a 1924 charter member of the North Central Association, now AdvancED.

Curriculum 
The assumed course of study at Searcy High School is the Smart Core curriculum developed by the Arkansas Department of Education (ADE). Searcy High School was first accredited by the North Central Association in 1924, followed by accreditation by AdvancED when the NCA unified with AdvancED starting in 2009–10.  Students engage in regular and Advanced Placement (AP) coursework and exams to obtain at least 22 units before graduation. Exceptional students have been recognized as National Merit Finalists and participated in Arkansas Governor's School.

Extracurricular activities 
The Searcy High School mascot is the lion with red and black]] serving as the school colors. For the 2012–2014 seasons, the Searcy Lions participate in the state's second largest classification (6A) within the combined 6A/7A East Conference. Competition is primarily sanctioned by the Arkansas Activities Association (AAA) with the Lions competing in basketball (boys/girls), bowling, cheer, cross country, football, golf (boys/girls), swimming (girls), tennis (boys/girls), and volleyball.

The Searcy lions football team won the 6A state championship in 2019, making it the first time they've won state since 1933.

The boys' cross country team was won seven consecutive state championships between 1966 and 1972. The boys' bowling team won the 7A/6A state championship in 2011. The girls' golf team has won six state titles between 1971 and 1994. The boys' soccer team captured six state titles including five consecutive state championships (2007–11, 2013) with the girls' soccer team winning four state titles (2007, 2008, 2010, 2013).

Notable alumni 
 Bill Dickey—professional baseball player and manager; member of the National Baseball Hall of Fame.
 Wilbur Mills—class valedictorian; member of the U.S. House of Representatives from Arkansas's 2nd congressional district (1939-1977).
 Weston Dacus (2004)—United Football League professional football player.

References

External links 

 

1870 establishments in Arkansas
Public high schools in Arkansas
Schools in White County, Arkansas
Buildings and structures in Searcy, Arkansas
Educational institutions established in 1870